Jerzy Drzewiecki (7 August 1902 – 15 May  1990) was a Polish aeroplane constructor, an engineer and one of the founders of the RWD construction bureau, along with Rogalski and Wigura. He was born in Warsaw. Among his most notable constructions is the RWD-7 aeroplane.

During World War II he went to Britain and became a ferry pilot with the Air Transport Auxiliary, taking new and damaged aircraft from one airfield to another.

He went to live in Canada and died in 1990 in Ottawa.

Polish aerospace engineers
Polish emigrants to Canada
Polish people of the Polish–Soviet War
People from Warsaw Governorate
Engineers from Warsaw
1902 births
1990 deaths